Channing may refer to:

Places
 Channing, Michigan, U.S.
 Channing, Texas, U.S.

Other uses
 Channing (name)
 Channing (TV series), a 1960s television series, also known as The Young and the Bold, starring Jason Evers and Henry Jones

See also
 Chann (disambiguation)
 Channing High School, Channing, Texas, U.S.
 Channing School For Girls, Highgate, London, UK